The House of Kosača (Kosače / Косаче), somewhere Kosačić (Kosačići / Косачићи), was a Bosnian medieval noble family which ruled over parts of modern-day Bosnia and Herzegovina, Croatia, Montenegro, and Serbia between the 14th century and the 15th century. The land they controlled was known as Humska zemlja (Hum, for short), roughly corresponding to modern region of Herzegovina, which itself was derived from the title "Herzog", which Stjepan Vukčić Kosača adopted in 1448., with latin title "Dux Sancti Sabbae". Besides Hum, they ruled parts of Dalmatia and Rascia. They were vassals to several states, including the Kingdom of Bosnia and Ottoman Empire. Historians think the Kosača family is part of the Kőszegi family (House of Herceg), but there is a lack of evidence for this claim.

The religious confession of the Kosača family is uncertain. They were in contact with the Eastern Orthodox Church, the Church of Bosnia, the Roman Catholic Church and Islam. During the fall of the Bosnian Kingdom, the "Kosače" split into three branches: Venetian, Dalmatian and Ottoman. From then onward, these branches became accepting of the Roman Catholic faith, in the first two cases, and of Islam in the third.

History

The family name Kosača was probably taken after the village of Kosače near Goražde, in the Upper Drina region of eastern Bosnia, where the Kosača family were originally estate owners.

The founder, Vuk was a prominent military commander under Emperor Dušan the Mighty of Serbia (r. 1331–1359) who took part in the conquests of southern Balkans. He was given lands around Upper Drina, province of Rudine.

Vlatko Vuković, the son of Vuk, brought the family to prominence after taking part in battles against the Ottomans. He commanded the victorious Bosnian army at the Battle of Bileća (1388). At the Battle of Kosovo (1389) Bosnian King Tvrtko I sent him to command with his troops. Bosnian contingent under Vlatko was positioned at the left flank from the Serbian army led by Prince Lazar of Serbia. The battle was at first reported as a victory, also by Vlatko himself, however it has been concluded as inconclusive, with a long-term Ottoman victory.

In 1448, Stjepan Vukčić Kosača styled himself "By the Grace of God Herceg of Hum and Duke of Primorje, Bosnian Grand Duke, Knyaz of Drina and the rest", adding "Herceg of Hum and the Coast" to the style, and in 1450 he styled himself "By the Grace of God Stjepan Herceg of Saint Sava, Lord of Hum and Bosnian Grand Duke, Knyaz of Drina and the rest", adding "Herceg of Saint Sava". This title had considerable public relations value, because Sava's relics were consider miracle-working by people of all Christian faiths. The Kosačas themselves, however, were one of the few non-Orthodox noble families in Hum. His lands were known as Herzog's lands or later Herzegovina.

King Stjepan Tomaš of Bosnia married Katarina Kosača, daughter of Stjepan Vukčić, in a Catholic ceremony in May 1446 ensuring, at least for a short while, he had the support of the most powerful nobleman in the kingdom and a staunch supporter of the Bosnian Church, Stjepan Vukčić.

Members

Vuk Kosača, military commander (voivode)
Vlatko Vuković, Grand Duke of Bosnia, died 1392
Hrana Vuković
Sandalj Hranić, Grand Duke of Bosnia, ca 1392–1435
Vuk Hranić, knyaz in the Bosnian court
Ivan Vuković, prince 
Adam Vuković
Vukac Hranić, knyaz in the Bosnian court
Stjepan Vukčić Kosača, Grand Duke of Bosnia 1435–1466, also Herzog of Saint Sava, 1450–1466
Vladislav Hercegović, Grand Duke of Bosnia, ca. 1450–1463
Balša Hercegović (fl. 1455) 
Petar

Vlatko Hercegović, Herzog of Saint Sava, 1466–1482

Hersekzade Ahmed Pasha,, born Stjepan Hercegović, Ottoman Grand Vizier, married to Hundi Hatun, the daughter of Sultan Bayezid II
Mara Hercegović
Katarina Kosača-Kotromanić, Queen consort of Bosnia - wife of Stjepan Tomaš, King of Bosnia
Sigismund (Šimun) Kotromanić, later converted to Islam and changed his name to Isak-beg Kraljević 
Katarina Kotromanić, later she converted to Islam and changed her name to Tahiri-hanuma, buried in Skopje in "turbe" (mausoleum)

Religious legacy

Orthodox
The Eastern Orthodox church building attributed as endowment of Stjepan Vukčić is the Church of Saint George in Sopotnica near Goražde, which is believed to be finished during 1452. In the valley of Šćepan Polje, below the Soko fort ruins, also foundation remains of the small church of Saint Stephen have been found but the results of archaeological research have never been published, however, it is believed to be endowment of Sandalj Hranić.

Catholic
Catholics from the region often visit Katarina Kosača's tomb in the Roman church of Santa Maria in Aracoeli.
Her tombstone features a life-size portrait and the coat of arms of the Kotromanići and Kosača at each side. The inscription, originally written in Bosnian Cyrillic (Inscription, external link) but in 1590 replaced with a Latin one, which reads:

Islam
"Turbe" mausoleum in Skopje was destroyed in the 1963 Skopje earthquake. The mausoleum in memory of Princess Katherine Kotromanić, referred in Turkish sources as the "Tahiri-hanuma", was built by Isa beg Ishaković, a member of the Kosaca Ottoman branch. It was significant as being an example of very rare occurrence that a mausoleum is dedicated to a female person. After the quake, the mausoleum of the princess was reconstructed in 2014 by the Ministry of Culture of Macedonia with financial contributions from the Ministry of Culture and Sports of Bosnia and Herzegovina. A tradition of the locals has been maintained to this day by the visiting and burning of candles.

References

Sources

 А. Ивић: Родословне таблице српских династија и властеле, Нови Сад 1928.
 Дио Сандаљевог депозита за побочну грану племена Косача,  У: Српска проза данас : Косаче оснивачи Херцеговине / Ћоровићеви сусрети прозних писаца у Билећи, Научни скуп историчара у Гацку ; [приређивач Радослав Братић]. - Билећа : Просвјета ; Гацко : Просвјета ; Београд : Фонд "Светозар и Владимир Ћоровић", 2002, 261-268.
 Родоначелник племена Косача – војвода Влатко Вуковић, У: Српска проза данас : Косаче оснивачи Херцеговине / Ћоровићеви сусрети прозних писаца у Билећи. Научни скуп историчара у Гацку / [приређивач Радослав Братић]. - Билећа : Просвјета ; Гацко : Просвјета ; Београд : Фонд “Светозар и Владимир Ћоровић”, 2002, 243-260.
 Споредна грана племена Косача, У: Зборник за историју Босне и Херцеговине 3 (2002) 61-77.
Учешће Косача у ослобађању Јајца од Турака 1463. године, У: Српска проза данас : Косаче оснивачи Херцеговине / Ћоровићеви сусрети прозних писаца у Билећи, Научни скуп историчара у Гацку / [приређивач Радослав Братић]. - Билећа: Просвјета; Гацко: Просвјета; Београд: Фонд "Светозар и Владимир Ћоровић", 2002, 464-475.

 Prof. Dr. Feridun Emecen, TDV İslâm Ansiklopedisi, Turkish academic encyclopedia for Islamic studies, p. 524,525
 Prof. Tayyib Gökbilgin, Edirne ve Paşa Livası, Istanbul 1952.  p. 333-334
 Dr. Ćiro Truhelka, Tursko-slovjenski spomenici dubrovačke arhive, Glasnik Zemaljskog muzeja BiH XXIII. 1911. Sarajevo p. 437-484

 
Kingdom of Bosnia
Ottoman period in the history of Bosnia and Herzegovina